Li Daichun (born December 12, 1977 in Nantong) is a Go player. He is an 8 dan (Amateur) player from China. He has won many titles. He is the winner of the World Amateur Go Championship in 2001.

References
An interview with Li Daichun

1977 births
Living people
Chinese Go players
Sportspeople from Wuxi